Isuzu is a Japanese vehicle manufacturer.

Isuzu may also refer to:

Isuzu River, a body of water in Japan
Japanese cruiser Isuzu, a Nagara-class cruiser in the Imperial Japanese Navy launched in 1921
Isuzu-class destroyer escort, a class of naval vessel in the Japan Maritime Self-Defense Force
Isuzu Yamada (1917–2012), Japanese actress
Isuzu Sohma, a fictional character from the Fruit Baskets manga series
Emi Isuzu, a character in the manga and anime series Tenjho Tenge

See also

Ishikawajima, former name of Isuzu Motors

Japanese feminine given names
Japanese-language surnames